Lee Lake is a small lake at the southeast corner of Redcliff Nunatak on the southern flank of Mackay Glacier, in Victoria Land, Antarctica. The ice is piled up on the west side and sweeps around the north and south sides to the lee side, where it is much lower, and where this lake has formed from meltwater. The lake was given this descriptive name by the Western Journey Party, led by Thomas Griffith Taylor, of the British Antarctic Expedition, 1910–13.

References

Lakes of Victoria Land
Scott Coast